Tânia Ferreira da Silva (born 17 December 1986) is a Brazilian athlete who specialises in the triple jump. She represented her country at the 2007 World Championships failing to qualify for the final.

Competition record

1Did not finish in the final

Personal bests
Outdoor
Long jump – 6.47 (-0.3 m/s) (São Paulo 2010)
Triple jump – 14.11 (+1.8 m/s) (Uberlândia 2007)
Indoor
Triple jump – 13.70 (Valladolid 2008)

References

1986 births
Living people
Brazilian female triple jumpers
World Athletics Championships athletes for Brazil
South American Games gold medalists for Brazil
South American Games silver medalists for Brazil
South American Games medalists in athletics
Competitors at the 2006 South American Games
21st-century Brazilian women